Augustinas Klimavicius (born 27 April 2001) is a Lithuanian footballer who plays as a forward for A Lyga club FC Hegelmann and the Lithuania national team.

International career
Klimavičius was called up to the senior national team for the first time for a pair of friendlies in March 2022. He went on to make his senior international debut on 25 March 2022 in the first match against San Marino. He scored his first goal for the team in the thirteenth minute, the opening goal of an eventual 2–1 victory.

International goals
Scores and results list Lithuania's goal tally first.

International statistics

References

External links
 Augustinas Klimavičius at FC Hegelmann
 
 
 

2001 births
Living people
Lithuanian footballers
FC Hegelmann players
Association football forwards
Lithuania international footballers
Lithuanian expatriate footballers
Expatriate footballers in Italy
Lithuanian expatriate sportspeople in Italy
A Lyga players